Ronkonkoma is a hamlet and census-designated place (CDP) in the Town of Islip in Suffolk County, on Long Island, in New York, United States. The population was 19,082 at the 2010 census. The Ronkonkoma post office has the ZIP Code 11779, and serves parts of several hamlets and CDPs adjacent to Ronkonkoma.

Ronkonkoma is also home to Long Island MacArthur Airport, which is owned and operated by the Town of Islip. The New York Air Route Traffic Control Center is located in Ronkonkoma.

History 
The name "Ronkonkoma" comes from the nearby Lake Ronkonkoma, which in turn comes from an Algonquian expression meaning "boundary fishing-lake", also earlier written as "Raconkumake" and "Raconkamuck."

Since 1988, Ronkonkoma has been the end of electrification along the Long Island Rail Road's Main Line. The track between Hicksville and Ronkonkoma is known as the Ronkonkoma Branch. In 2017, Governor Andrew Cuomo announced the groundbreaking of a new $650 million development to create a Ronkonkoma Hub near the LIRR Line, similar to the hub in neighboring Brookhaven.

Ronkonkoma was the terminus of the first road in the United States designed exclusively for automobiles, the Vanderbilt Motor Parkway, constructed by a consortium of investors called the Long Island Motor Parkway, Inc. led by William Kissam Vanderbilt II.

Geography
The community is adjacent to Lake Ronkonkoma.

Demographics

As of the 2020 United States Census, there were 18,955 people and 6,150 households residing in the CDP. The racial makeup of the CDP was 77.7% White, 4.5% African American, 7.7% Asian, 5.1% from other races, and 5.0% from two or more races. Hispanic or Latino of any race were 20.9% of the population.

In the CDP, the population was spread out, with 20.1% under the age of 18, 6.1% under the age of five, and 13.6% who were 65 years of age or older. 

The median income for a household in the CDP was $114,216, while the per capita income for the CDP was $41,792. About 3.5% of the population were below the poverty line.

Neighborhoods 
 Lake Hills is north of the Long Island Expressway and south of Long Island Motor Parkway, roughly bounded by Rosevale Avenue to the east and Terry Road to the west.
 Lakeland is south of the Long Island Expressway and north of Veterans Memorial Hwy, bounded on the west by Lakeland County Park and Connetquot River State Park and on the east by Ronkonkoma Ave and Lakeland Ave.

Economy
Vitamin maker The Bountiful Company is based in Ronkonkoma.

Notable people

 Stefanie DeLeo (born 1982), author, playwright
 Keith Detelj (born 1985), soccer player
 Joe Grimaldi (born 1986), ice hockey player
 Steve Hass (born 1975), musician/music producer
 Joe Jones (born 1965), basketball coach
 Moira Kelly (born 1968), actress
 Lennon Murphy (born 1982), singer-songwriter
 Joseph Raffaele, religious leader
 Scott Rudolph, entrepreneur
 Thorgy Thor (born 1984 as Shane Galligan), drag queen, violinist
 Alexis Weik, New York state senator

Ronkonkoma in popular culture
In The Oh, Hello Show, John Mulaney's character George St. Geegland wrote a book called Next Stop Ronkonkoma. The book is the story of 100 people on a train on Long Island. The book is written from 100 different perspectives, and is more than 1000 pages long.
 In the season 7 episode of How I Met Your Mother entitled "The Drunk Train", Barney says "I was all, do I look like I'm from Ronkonkoma?"
 Ronkonkoma is referenced in Law and Order Special Victims Unit, (Season 16xE11: "Agent Provocateur"), where a character states she lives in Ronkonkoma.
 Ronkonkoma is referenced in two songs by singer/songwriter Mike Doughty: "Busting Up a Starbucks" and "Like a Luminous Girl."
 Ronkonkoma was referenced by Artie Lange during the March 3, 2009, taping of the Late Show with David Letterman. The comic recounted a story of sitting in front of a fan at Yankees games who repeatedly cheered on Derek Jeter by shouting, "Do it for Ronkonkoma!" to which Lange replied "No one's doing anything for Ronkonkoma!"
 Two characters in the movie 200 Cigarettes are visiting New York City from Ronkonkoma.
George Burns mentioned Ronkonkoma on an episode of The George Burns and Gracie Allen Show; coincidentally, Burns often performed in Ronkonkoma early in his career.
Edith Bunker mentioned Ronkonkoma in the "Archie is Jealous" episode of All in the Family.

References

Brookhaven, New York
Islip (town), New York
Hamlets in New York (state)
Census-designated places in New York (state)
Census-designated places in Suffolk County, New York
Hamlets in Suffolk County, New York